The basketball qualification for the Summer Olympics men's basketball tournament occurred from 2010 to 2012; all five FIBA (International Basketball Federation) zones sent in teams.

The first qualifying tournament was the 2010 FIBA World Championship in which the champion was guaranteed of a place in the Olympics. Throughout the next two years, several regional tournaments served as qualification for the zonal tournaments, which doubled as intercontinental championships, to determine which teams would participate in the 2012 London Summer Olympics.

Qualification

Outright qualification
A total of 12 teams took part in the Olympics, with each NOC sending in one team. The host nation (Great Britain) qualified automatically as hosts.

There were a total of 5 zonal tournaments (doubling as intercontinental championships) that determined the qualifying teams, with a total of 7 teams qualifying outright. Each zone was allocated with the following qualifying berths:
FIBA Africa: 1 team (Champion)
FIBA Americas: 2 teams (Champion and runner-up)
FIBA Asia: 1 team (Champion)
FIBA Europe: 2 teams (Champion and runner-up)
FIBA Oceania: 1 team (Champion)

Furthermore, the current world champion, United States qualified automatically by winning at the 2010 FIBA World Championship.

Qualification via the wild card tournament
The additional three teams were determined at the 2012 FIBA World Olympic Qualifying Tournament for Men, with the best non-qualifying teams participating from teams that did not qualify outright. Each zone was allocated with the following berths:

FIBA Africa: 2 teams
FIBA Americas: 3 teams
FIBA Asia: 2 teams
FIBA Europe: 4 teams
FIBA Oceania: 1 team

Summary
These are the final standings of the different Olympic qualifying tournaments. The venues are as follows, with the city of the knockout stage mentioned first:
2010 FIBA World Championship: Turkey
2011 FIBA Africa Championship: Madagascar
2011 FIBA Americas Championship: Argentina
2011 FIBA Asia Championship: China
FIBA EuroBasket 2011: Lithuania
2011 FIBA Oceania Championship: Australia
2012 FIBA World Olympic Qualifying Tournament for Men: Venezuela

References

 
Basketball at the Summer Olympics – Men's qualification
qualification